Alain Arroyo Martínez de la Cuadra (born 5 July 1982) is a Spanish former professional footballer who played mainly as a forward, and the current manager of Urduliz FT.

Club career
Arroyo was born in Bilbao, Biscay. Starting out in amateur football in his native Basque Country, he scored the winning goal in the final of the 2005 UEFA Regions' Cup while playing for the Basque Country amateur team, and subsequently signed for Deportivo Alavés B of Segunda División B, remaining in that tier the next six seasons representing Club Portugalete (a club he had already played for), Sestao River Club, SD Lemona, CD Guadalajara and CD Mirandés.

In his second season with Mirandés, Arroyo scored a career-best 13 goals to help the Castille and León side achieve promotion to Segunda División for the first time in their history. He played his first match in the competition on 17 August 2012, coming on as a substitute in a 0–1 home loss against SD Huesca, and scored his first goal roughly one month later in a 2–2 draw at Real Murcia.

On 5 June 2013, playing for a Biscay XI in a friendly against Athletic Bilbao, Arroyo scored the last ever goal at the San Mamés Stadium before it was torn down to make way for a new ground.

References

External links

1982 births
Living people
Spanish footballers
Footballers from Bilbao
Association football forwards
Segunda División players
Segunda División B players
Tercera División players
Arenas Club de Getxo footballers
Club Portugalete players
Deportivo Alavés B players
Sestao River footballers
SD Lemona footballers
CD Guadalajara (Spain) footballers
CD Mirandés footballers
Real Oviedo players
Barakaldo CF footballers
Zamudio SD players
Spanish football managers
Tercera Federación managers